Eileen Panigeo MacLean (June 12, 1949 – April 24, 1996) was an American politician and educator who served as a member of the Alaska House of Representatives from 1989 to 1996.

Early life and education
MacLean was born in Utqiaġvik, Alaska Territory, and was Iñupiaq. She graduated from Mt. Edgecumbe High School, in Sitka, Alaska, in 1968. MacLean received her bachelor's degree in elementary education from University of Alaska Fairbanks in 1975 and her master's degree in education from University of Copenhagen in 1983.

Career 
MacLean worked as a junior high school teacher and was involved in the real estate business. MacLean served on the North Slope Borough Assembly and on the North Slope School Board. She was a Democrat. MacLean served in the Alaska House of Representatives from 1989 until her resignation on January 12, 1996, due to health problems. Before that she was on the executive board of the Inuit Circumpolar Conference and the Arctic Slope Regional Corporation. MacLean was also an executive director of the Alaska Eskimo Whaling Commission.

Personal life
Her daughter is Tara Sweeney, an activist and businesswoman. MacLean died at her home in Utqiaġvik after a long illness.

Notes

1949 births
1996 deaths
People from Utqiagvik, Alaska
Inupiat people
University of Alaska Fairbanks alumni
University of Copenhagen alumni
Inuit politicians
Businesspeople from Alaska
Educators from Alaska
American women educators
Women state legislators in Alaska
Borough assembly members in Alaska
School board members in Alaska
Democratic Party members of the Alaska House of Representatives
Native American state legislators in Alaska
20th-century American politicians
20th-century American women politicians
20th-century American businesspeople